Anubias barteri var. nana was first described by Adolf Engler in 1899 as A. nana. The species was reduced to varietal status in 1979.

Common names
Dwarf Anubias.

Distribution
West Africa: Only known from Victoria, Cameroon.

Description
It is a dwarf variety of Anubias barteri. This plant's thick short-stemmed dark green leaves are some of the smallest and most compact in the Anubias genus, growing only to 3.2 inches (8 cm) for a total height of 4.7 inches (12 cm).

A variation of Anubias barteri var. nana known as Anubias barteri var. nana gold is available in the aquarium trade, it has light green to golden leaves.

Cultivation
Like most Anubias species, this plant grows well partially and fully submersed and the rhizome must be above the substrate, attached to rocks or wood. It grows well in a range of lighting and has a temperature range of 68-82 degrees F (20-28 degrees C). It can be propagated by dividing the rhizome or by separating side shoots.

References

barteri var. nana
Freshwater plants
Flora of Cameroon
Plants described in 1899